Cape Hinks is a bold headland on the south side of the entrance to Bertius Inlet, and surmounted by a high ice-covered dome, marking the northern extremity of the Finley Heights on the east coast of Palmer Land, Antarctica. It was discovered and photographed by Sir Hubert Wilkins on his flight of December 20, 1928. It was later photographed from the air by Lincoln Ellsworth in 1935, and by the United States Antarctic Service (USAS) in 1940. The cape was named by the Advisory Committee on Antarctic Names for Arthur R. Hinks, Secretary of the Royal Geographical Society, 1915–45, who undertook in his published studies to reconcile the explorations of Wilkins, Ellsworth, John Rymill and the USAS in this general area.

References

Headlands of Palmer Land